Ralph William Jesson (July 22, 1893 – January 11, 1985) was an American college football coach. He served as the head coach at Loyola College of Los Angeles—now known as Loyola Marymount University—in 1920.

Biography
Jesson attended Pomona College, where he played on the football team in 1915. He served as the freshman coach at Occidental College.

In 1920, Jesson served as head coach for Loyola, where he compiled a 0–2–1 record. From 1924 to 1928, he coached the football team at Polytechnic High School in Los Angeles, California. From 1930 to 1934, he coached the school's basketball team. In the 1930s, he also worked as a football official in the Pacific Coast Conference.

Jesson and his wife, Vivian Rich, the silent film actress, lived in Los Angeles, California. They had three children, the eldest of whom was Ralph William Jr.

Head coaching record

References

External links
 

1893 births
1985 deaths
College football officials
Loyola Lions football coaches
Occidental Tigers football coaches
Pomona-Pitzer Sagehens football players
High school football coaches in California
High school basketball coaches in California
Pomona College alumni
Players of American football from Los Angeles
Sports coaches from Los Angeles